Kevin Edward McCarthy (born February 22, 1992) is an American professional baseball pitcher for the Cleburne Railroaders of the American Association of Professional Baseball. He has played in Major League Baseball (MLB) for the Kansas City Royals.

Early years
McCarthy attended Kellenberg Memorial High School in Uniondale, New York, and played college baseball at Marist College. He was drafted by the Kansas City Royals in the 16th round of the 2013 Major League Baseball draft.

Professional career
McCarthy signed with the Royals and spent 2013 with the Burlington Royals where he was 4–2 with a 3.40 earned run average (ERA) in  innings pitched. He pitched in only two games in 2014 due to injury. In 2015, he played for the Lexington Legends, Wilmington Blue Rocks, and Northwest Arkansas Naturals where he posted a 5–4 record and 2.74 ERA in 33 relief appearances. In 2016, he pitched with Northwest Arkansas and the Omaha Storm Chasers where he compiled a 5–6 record, 3.04 ERA, and 1.15 WHIP in 47 appearances out of the bullpen.

Kansas City Royals
McCarthy was called up to the majors for the first time on September 6, 2016. He made his major league debut on September 9, appearing in the eighth inning during the Royals' 7–2 loss to the Chicago White Sox; he retired the only batter he faced. He made a total of 10 appearances with the 2016 Royals, accruing a 6.48 ERA with a 1–0 record and 7 strikeouts in  innings pitched.

In 2017, McCarthy split time between the minors and the Royals bullpen. In 33 games for the Royals, he again posted a 1–0 record, recording 27 strikeouts in 45 innings with a 3.20 ERA. In 2018, McCarthy appeared in 65 games, all in relief; he pitched to a 3.25 ERA and a 5–4 record, with 46 strikeouts in 72 innings pitched. McCarthy made the Royals' 2019 Opening Day roster. For the season, he compiled a 4–2 record and 4.48 ERA in 56 games, and 38 strikeouts in  innings pitched. With the 2020 Royals, McCarthy appeared in five games, registering no decisions with a 4.50 ERA and two strikeouts in six innings pitched.

On October 30, 2020, McCarthy was outrighted off the Royals roster; he became a free agent instead of accepting a Triple-A assignment. Overall, in parts of five seasons with Kansas City, he appeared in 169 games (all in relief) while striking out 120 batters in  innings pitched with a record of 11–6 and a 3.80 ERA.

Boston Red Sox
On November 16, 2020, McCarthy signed a minor league contract with the Boston Red Sox. McCarthy did not make the club out of Spring Training but chose not to trigger the opt-out clause in his contract. 

McCarthy appeared in 28 games in 2021 for the Triple-A Worcester Red Sox, posting a 7.13 ERA with 35 strikeouts. On August 23, 2021, McCarthy was released by the Red Sox.

Chicago White Sox
On September 7, 2021, McCarthy signed a minor league deal with the Chicago White Sox. He was assigned to the Triple-A Charlotte Knights.

Chicago Cubs
On March 1, 2022, McCarthy signed a minor league deal with the Chicago Cubs organization. McCarthy logged 3 appearances for the Triple-A Iowa Cubs, struggling to a 9.00 ERA with 4 strikeouts in 4.0 innings pitched before he was released on May 3.

Cleburne Railroaders
On May 26, 2022, McCarthy signed with the Cleburne Railroaders of the American Association.

References

External links

Marist Red Foxes bio

1992 births
Living people
People from Rockville Centre, New York
Baseball players from New York (state)
Major League Baseball pitchers
Kansas City Royals players
Marist Red Foxes baseball players
Burlington Royals players
Lexington Legends players
Wilmington Blue Rocks players
Northwest Arkansas Naturals players
Surprise Saguaros players
Omaha Storm Chasers players
Worcester Red Sox players